The Graduate School of Economics and International Relations (or ASERI) is an Italian public policy and public administration school, which trains experts of economic and political global systems. It is one of Università Cattolica del Sacro Cuore's Postgraduate Schools. This school offers Master's courses, Executive Courses, summer/winter schools and organizes seminars.

History
ASERI was founded in 1995 thanks to the co-operation between the Faculty of Political Science of the UCSC and the Milan Chamber of Commerce.

Master's degrees
ASERI, in collaboration with the UCSC's Faculty of Political Sciences, offers some master's degrees:
 International Relations
 International Development and Cooperation
 Economies and International Policies (in collaboration with University of Lugano)
 Middle Eastern Studies

ASERI Executive
There is a specific section of the institute, called ASERI Executive, which offers executive courses, training programs, consultancy and research for companies. ASERI Executive is divided into three areas:
 ASERI Executive for Managers
 ASERI Executive for Leaders
 ASERI Executive for Young Professionals

Notable professors
 Michael Cox
 Joseph Grieco
 John Ikenberry
 Lorenzo Ornaghi

References

External links
  

Università Cattolica del Sacro Cuore
Graduate schools in Italy
Universities and colleges in Milan
Schools of international relations
Educational institutions established in 1995
1995 establishments in Italy